Edmund Walrond (1655–1708), of Bovey, Seaton, Devon, was an English politician.

He was a Member (MP) of the Parliament of England for Honiton in 1685 and 1689.

References

1655 births
1708 deaths
Members of the Parliament of England (pre-1707) for Honiton
English MPs 1685–1687
English MPs 1689–1690